Bangladesh National Award for Best Short Film is one of the categories in the National Film Awards presented annually by the Department of Films and Publications, the organisation set up by Ministry of Information in Bangladesh. It is the highest award for films in Bangladesh. This award goes to the producers of the film and is the only category in a year.

References

1982 establishments in Bangladesh
Awards established in 1982
Bangladeshi film awards